Vidice is a municipality and village in Kutná Hora District in the Central Bohemian Region of the Czech Republic. It has about 300 inhabitants.

Administrative parts
Villages of Karlov t. Doubrava, Nová Lhota, Roztěž and Tuchotice are administrative parts of Vidice.

References

Villages in Kutná Hora District